Miguel Ángel Merentiel Serrano (born 24 February 1996) is a Uruguayan professional footballer who plays as a forward for Argentine Primera División club Boca Juniors.

Club career
Merentiel was born in Paysandú, and was a Peñarol youth graduate. On 9 January 2017, he was loaned to fellow Primera División club El Tanque Sisley, for six months.

Merentiel made his professional debut on 19 February 2017, starting in a 3–4 away loss against CA Cerro; seven days later he scored his first goal, netting the first in a 2–1 away win against Liverpool FC. On 12 March, he scored a brace in a 2–1 win at Montevideo Wanderers FC.

On 3 August 2017 Merentiel moved abroad for the first time in his career, after agreeing to a one-year loan deal with Segunda División side Lorca FC. The following 31 January, his loan was cut short.

In January 2019, Merentiel was signed by Argentine club Godoy Cruz for a fee around 175.000 euros. On 10 September 2020, Merentiel was loaned out to Defensa y Justicia until the end of 2021 with a purchase option. On 2 January 2022, Defensa triggered the option and signed him on a permanently contract until the end of 2024.

On May 18 2022, Merentiel signed a four-year contract with Palmeiras. In January 2023, Merentiel was loaned to Argentine club Boca Juniors with a trade option of US$3 million.

Honours 
Defensa y Justicia
Copa Sudamericana: 2020
Recopa Sudamericana: 2021

Palmeiras
Campeonato Brasileiro Série A: 2022
Supercopa do Brasil: 2023

Boca Juniors
Supercopa Argentina: 2022

References

External links

1996 births
Living people
Footballers from Paysandú
Uruguayan footballers
Uruguayan expatriate footballers
Association football forwards
Uruguayan Primera División players
Segunda División players
Argentine Primera División players
Peñarol players
El Tanque Sisley players
Lorca FC players
Godoy Cruz Antonio Tomba footballers
Defensa y Justicia footballers
Sociedade Esportiva Palmeiras players
Expatriate footballers in Spain
Expatriate footballers in Argentina
Uruguayan expatriate sportspeople in Spain
Uruguayan expatriate sportspeople in Argentina